Keshav Chandra Pandey (5 July 1943 1 December 2019), popularly known as K. C. Pandey, was an Indian educationist and zoologist with 55 years research experience, a Fellow of the Zoological Society of India (F.ZSI), and a Fellow of the Helminthological Society of India (FHSI).

Career
Pandey started his teaching career in 1967 at Zoology Department, Lucknow University. In 1980 he was selected as Professor and Head in the Department of Zoology, Meerut University (now CCS University, Meerut). He rejoined Lucknow University in 1990, and eventually became Dean of the Faculty of Science.

From 1994 to 1997 Pandey served as the Vice Chancellor of CCS University, Meerut, and, after his full term as Vice Chancellor, he rejoined Lucknow University in late 1997. His teaching experience spanned about 50 years, during which he supervised more than 50 Ph.D. and MPhil candidates. After his retirement from Lucknow University, he continued with research work and ISCA   were he got elected as the 98th General President of the Indian Science Congress Association in 2010–11. It was inaugurated by Prime Minister Manmohan Singh. As a Life Member of ISCA, he held various positions before getting elected as the General President (2010–2011), including member of the Executive Council and Recorder (2001–2002) and Sectional President (2005–2006) of Animal, Veterinary and Fishery Sciences.

Pandey was also member of the Institute Body of AIIMS, New Delhi.

Pandey undertook advanced research on Fish parasitology and has authored or co-authored about 200 research papers. His work was on biodiversity of helminthes and parasites of vertebrates in general, and fish in particular. His work on new and known species of trematode, Cestode nematode, monogenea, and acanthocephalan, which cause mass mortalities.

As a researcher, he presented various research papers like one in International Symposium on Monogenea.
His last book was released after his death.

In 2010, Pandey was selected as Emeritus Professor at the Department of Zoology, CCS University. He remained in this post until his death.

Medals and awards
 BS Chauhan Gold Medal by Zoological Society of India (1980 )
 Bhalerao Gold Medal by Helminthological Society of India (1991)
 Indian Society of Life Sciences Gold Medal (1981)
 K.N. Bahl Memorial Gold Medal by Indian Society of Biosciences (1994–1995)
 Congress of Zoology Gold Medal by Zoological Society of India (2005)
 Sir Dorba Ji Tata Gold Medal by Zoological Society of India (1995–1997)
 E.P. Odum Gold Medal by International Society for Communication (2007)
 Sarswati Samman by Government of Uttar Pradesh (2010)
 Great World Earth Legend Award (2017)

Selected bibliography
 K. C. Pandey (1988). Concepts of Indian Fisheries. Shree Publishing House. p. 146. 
 K. C. Pandey (1996). Functional Morphology Of Wallago Attu (schneider). Shree Publishers & Distributors. p. 320. , 9788170711612.
 K. C. Pandey (2018). Trematode Fauna of Freshwater Fishes of India. Zoological Survey of India. p. 388. 
 K. C. Pandey (2020). Textbook of ICHTHYOLOGY. Daya Publishing House . p. 554.

Selected research papers

References

General references

http://www.marinespecies.org/aphia.php?p=taxdetails&id=727821

1943 births
2019 deaths
Scholars from Lucknow
20th-century Indian biologists
Indian scientific authors
People from Ballia
20th-century Indian zoologists
Monogenea